Svir can refer to:

Svir, a river in Leningrad Oblast, Russia 
Svir, Belarus, town in Myadzyel District, Belarus
, lake in Myadzyel District, Belarus
9M119 Svir anti tank missile